The Statute Law Revision Act (Northern Ireland) 1952 (c 1) (NI) is an Act of the Parliament of Northern Ireland.

This Act was passed under powers conferred by the Statute Law Revision Act 1950.

This Act is one of the Statute Law Revision Acts (Northern Ireland) 1952 and 1953 and the Statute Law Revision Acts (Northern Ireland) 1952 to 1954.

Schedule
The Schedule was repealed by section 1 of, and Part II of the Schedule to, the Statute Law Revision (Northern Ireland) Act 1973.

Sources

Citations

External links
The Statute Law Revision Act (Northern Ireland) 1952, as amended from the National Archives.

Acts of the Parliament of Northern Ireland 1952